Bloom (sometimes stylized as BlooM) is a mod for id Software's video game Doom II. It is designed to merge all of the enemies, weapons and environment elements of Monolith Productions' Blood and Doom II, creating a crossover of both game universes. It was developed by Spanish indie studio Bloom Team and released via Mod DB on October 31, 2021.

Gameplay 
The mod features a new episode "The Way of Doomed Flesh" which includes a total of nine levels, an original story, cutscenes and a new soundtrack composed by ASCIIM0V and Buio Mondo. Bloom allows players to choose between Doomguy and Caleb (with their own distinct weapons and perks) and replaces the original enemies with new hybrid variants based on both games.

New and updated weapons are included, such as a revolver, grenades or a flamethrower. The mod adds some graphical updates such as voxel models and improved lighting effects. It can be played in co-operative mode, as well as 5 different difficulty levels. Bloom is compatible with Doom, Doom II, Final Doom, Sigil and other custom WADs.

Reception 
Dominic Tarason of Rock, Paper, Shotgun named Bloom one of the best Doom mods and called it "an extremely cool concept" and "a real treat, visually and aurally". Chris J. Capel of PCGamesN said "Bloom is a ridiculously fun FPS" and "wonderfully unique hybrid. YouTube game reviewer GmanLives praised the mod level design, visuals and atmosphere and named it "one of the best Doom mods ever made".

Bloom won the awards for "Best Crossover mod" and "Best upcoming mod" by Mod DB in 2019.

In 2022, Bloom surpassed 40,000 downloads on Mod DB.

Sequel 
A spiritual successor titled Doom/Quake Crossover has been announced by Bloom Team's lead designer and programmer Antonio González (better known as Drugod).

See also 

Doom modding
Brutal Doom

References

External links 
Bloom at Mod DB
Bloom at GitHub
Bloom Team YouTube channel
Bloom Team on Facebook

Doom mods
Video game mods
First-person shooters
Video games with voxel graphics
Sprite-based first-person shooters
Multiplayer and single-player video games
Windows games
Linux games
MacOS games
Android (operating system) games
Crossover video games
Horror video games
Video games about demons
Video games developed in Spain
Cooperative video games
Dark fantasy video games
Video games with 2.5D graphics